At , Sidown Hill is the third highest hill in the county of Hampshire, England.

At the summit is a mid-18th century Grade II listed building known as Heaven's Gate which is hidden by the trees covering the top of the hill.

The hill is on the watershed of the Hampshire Basin and forms part of the Hampshire Downs.
 To the east is Beacon Hill.

On 5 May 1945 a USAAF B-17 Flying Fortress of 326th Bombardment Squadron crashed on Sidown Hill with the loss of six of its crew of seven.

References 

Hills of Hampshire